Xavier Wayne Mitchell (born June 10, 1986) is a former professional Canadian football defensive lineman. He was signed by the BC Lions as a street free agent in 2009. He played college football for the Tennessee Volunteers, and he is currently the Defensive coordinator at Clinton High School in Clinton, Tennessee.

References

External links
 Tennessee Volunteers bio
BC Lions bio

1986 births
Living people
People from Lakewood, California
American players of Canadian football
American football defensive linemen
Canadian football defensive linemen
Tennessee Volunteers football players
BC Lions players
Players of American football from California
Sportspeople from Los Angeles County, California
Knoxville NightHawks players